John J. Lincoln House is a historic home located at Elkhorn, McDowell County, West Virginia.  It was built in 1899, and is a -story, "L"-shaped, frame dwelling on a stone foundation. It features a multigabled roofline, half-timber decoration, and a hipped roof wrap-around porch.  Also on the property is a contributing two story I house and hipped roof, clapboard-sided dairy house.  It was built for John J. Lincoln, an influential leader in southern West Virginia's coal mining industry.

It was listed on the National Register of Historic Places in 1992.

References

Houses on the National Register of Historic Places in West Virginia
Houses completed in 1899
Houses in McDowell County, West Virginia
National Register of Historic Places in McDowell County, West Virginia
I-house architecture in West Virginia